Shiho Matsubara (born 7 July 1997) is a Japanese professional footballer who plays as a defender for WE League club Sanfrecce Hiroshima Regina.

Club career 
Matsubara made her WE League debut on 12 September 2021.

References 

Living people
1997 births
Japanese women's footballers
Women's association football defenders
Association football people from Osaka Prefecture
Sanfrecce Hiroshima Regina players
WE League players